was a Japanese noble of the Nara period and early Heian period. He was the third son of the dainagon Fujiwara no Matate and thus a member of the Hokke.

He served the emperors Kanmu, Heizei, and Saga, and was trusted and valued by each. He succeeded his uncle Nagate and his line as the head of the family. Unlike his father, whose secondary status in the family had prevented him from making daijin, Uchimaro rose to udaijin, and led the cabinet in Heizei's reign and the beginning of Saga's. He had many children, helping to lay the foundation for the later success of the Hokke.

Life 

This came shortly after Uchimaro's first wife, Kudara no Nagatsugu, who had since become a court lady, bore the emperor a prince. It has been theorized that this birth precipitated Uchimaro's rapid promotion, and even that he used Nagatsugu as collateral to deepen his relationship with the Emperor. During this period, he held various positions in the imperial guard and as a provincial governor.

In 794, immediately after the move of the capital to Heian-kyō, Uchimaro joined the kugyō with a promotion to sangi. At the age of 39, this made him the second youngest member of the cabinet after the 34-year-old  of the Nanke. He also obtained various other positions during this period, including general of the imperial guard. In 799 he was put in charge of the continued relocation to the capital. During the dispute between Fujiwara no Otsugu and Sugano no Mamichi, in which Otsugu persuaded the Emperor to suspend his campaign in Ezo and the construction of Heian-kyō, Uchimaro waited on Kanmu by his side.

When Emperor Heizei ascended to the throne in 806, Uchimaro was promoted to dainagon. He emerged unscathed from the attempted coup of Prince Iyo and the Kusuko Incident.

Uchimaro died on November 13, 812, at the age of 57.

Personality 

According to the Nihon Kōki, Uchimaro was mild-mannered and very popular, and people were happy to follow him. The emperors he served trusted him deeply, and while he did not flatter them, he did not remonstrate them when they disagreed. He served in important government positions for more than ten years without committing any blunders. He was noted to have an exceptionally ready wit.

Uchimaro commissioned statues of the Four Heavenly Kings and a version of Kannon and let his son Fuyutsugu offer them to Kōfuku-ji.

An anecdote in the Nihon Kōki states that when Prince Osabe was crown prince, he bore ill will toward Uchimaro and tried to injure him. There was a horse with a habit of kicking and biting, and the prince had Uchimaro mount this horse, but the horse kept its head down and did not try to move, and even when they whipped it, it simply turned around once.

Genealogy 
Father: Fujiwara no Matate
Mother: daughter of 
Son: 
Son: 
Wife: , second daughter of Sakanoue no Karitamaro
Son: 
Son: 
Son: 
Son:  
Daughter: 
Wife: daughter of 
Son: 
Wife: daughter of Fujiwara no Nagate
Son: 
Wife: (unknown)
Son: 
Son: 
Son: 
Son: 
Son: 
Daughter: , wife of Emperor Saga
Daughter: Wife of

Notes

References 

Fujiwara clan
756 births
812 deaths
People of Nara-period Japan